The short-tooth sawpalate (Serrivomer lanceolatoides, also known commonly as the black sawtoothed eel) is an eel in the family Serrivomeridae (sawtooth eels). It was described by Johannes Schmidt in 1916, originally under the genus Leptocephalus. It is a marine, deep water-dwelling eel which is known from the eastern central and western central Atlantic Ocean, including the Bahamas and Bermuda, as well as the Strait of Gibraltar, Cape Verde, Canada and the United States.

The species epithet "lanceolatoides" means "spear-like" in a combination of Latin and Greek, and refers to the eel's appearance. The short-tooth sawpalate's diet consists primarily of benthic crustaceans. It is reported to spawn between March and August in the Sargasso Sea.

The IUCN redlist currently lists the short-tooth sawpalate as Least Concern, due to the unlikelihood of it being endangered by any major threats as a result of its deep water habitat, and its lack of commercial interest to fisheries.

References

Nemichthyidae
Taxa named by Johannes Schmidt (biologist)
Fish described in 1916